Jonathan Wittenberg (born 17 September 1957 in Glasgow, Scotland) is a Masorti rabbi, the Senior Rabbi of Masorti Judaism UK. He is a leading writer and thinker on Judaism. He is Rabbi of the New North London Synagogue, with approximately 2400 members.
He is also a member of the Elijah Interfaith Institute Board of World Religious Leaders. He sometimes does Thought for the Day on the BBC Radio Four Today programme.

Personal life
He attended University College School, went to King's College, Cambridge and Leo Baeck College.
He was taught by Louis Jacobs.

He currently resides in North London. Rabbi Wittenberg is married to Nicola Solomon and they share three children.

Works
 Torah (1995)
 The Three Pillars of Judaism: A Search for Faith and Values (1997)
 The Laws of Life: A Guide to Traditional Jewish Practice at Times of Bereavement (1997)
 The Eternal Journey: Meditations of the Jewish Year (2003)
 The Silence of Dark Water: An Inner Journey (2008)
 Walking with the Light: From Frankfurt to Finchley (2013)
 My Dear Ones (2016)
 Things My Dog has Taught Me: About being a better human (2017)
 How Hassidim are at the forefront of Gender equality in Judaism

References 

British Conservative rabbis
20th-century British rabbis
21st-century British rabbis
British Jewish theologians
1957 births
Living people
People educated at University College School
Scottish rabbis
Alumni of Leo Baeck College